Bartine Burkett Zane (February 9, 1898 – May 20, 1994) was an American film actress. 

Burkett was born in Robeline, Louisiana to John Norvel Burkett and Bana G. (Howe) Burkett. She had a brother, Arthur. She gained acting experience in productions of the Shreveport Dramatic Club.

Burkett was engaged to be married, but her fiance, an American Expeditionary Forces officer, was killed in France in 1918. 

As early as 1914, Burkett worked as an extra in Famous Players-Lasky films. She progressed to feature roles by the end of that decade. She is best recalled for her silent comedies and her late-in-life appearances in sitcoms and TV commercials. She appeared in nearly sixty silent films before retiring upon her 1928 marriage to Ralph Leland Zane. Among her earliest co-stars and friends were Buster Keaton, Roscoe "Fatty" Arbuckle, Al St. John and Stan Laurel.

In 1973, five years after her husband's death, she returned to acting, appearing in three films and a number of television programs and advertisements.

She died in Burbank, California at age 96. She is buried in Forest Lawn Memorial Park in 
Los Angeles, California.

Selected filmography

 The Forest Nymph (1917)
 The Girl and the Ring (1917)
 The Magic Jazz-Bo (1917)
 Mum's the Word (1918)
 Clean Sweep (1918)
 Hello Trouble (1918)
 Hickory Hiram (1918)
 Home, James (1918)
 Hearts in Hock (1919)
 The Aero-Nut (1920)
 The Turning Point (1920)
 The High Sign (1921)
 Don't Write Letters (1922)
 Cornered (1924)
 He Who Gets Slapped (1924)
 The Golden Bed (1925)
 Seven Chances (1925)
 Curses! (1925)
 Galaxina (1980)
 The Devil and Max Devlin (1981)

References

External links

 

1898 births
1994 deaths
20th-century American actresses
American film actresses
American silent film actresses
Actresses from Louisiana
Burials at Forest Lawn Memorial Park (Hollywood Hills)
People from Natchitoches Parish, Louisiana